Dale R. Nyholt (born 1971) is an Australian human geneticist who is a professor in the School of Biomedical Sciences at Queensland University of Technology, where he also serves as Director of Research in the School of Biomedical Sciences and head of the Statistical and Genomic Epidemiology Laboratory.

Born in Geelong, Victoria, Australia, Nyholt was educated at Griffith University, where he received his BSc degree in 1993 and his PhD in 1998.

References

External links
Faculty page
Lab website

Living people
1971 births
Griffith University alumni
People from Geelong
Academic staff of Queensland University of Technology
Human geneticists
Statistical geneticists
Australian geneticists
20th-century Australian scientists
21st-century Australian scientists